Hayk Mkrtichi Grigoryan  (born September 15, 1976 in Yerevan, Armenian SSR, USSR), is an Armenian lawyer Armenian lawyer, former Chairman of the Investigative Committee of Armenia (10 July 2018 – 12 July 2021), Third Class State Councilor of Justice (since 2019), Doctor of Law (since 2021).

Biography 
Hayk Grigoryan was born on 15 September 1976 in Yerevan in what was the former Soviet Union. In 1993 graduated from a secondary school in Yerevan. From 1994-1996, he served in Armenian Army. In 1997, Grigoryan was admitted to the Prosecutorial and Investigative Division of the Special Faculty of the Military University of the Russian Ministry of Defense. In August 2001, by decree of the Prosecutor General of Armenia, he was appointed to the Military Prosecutor's Office of the 3rd Garrison, to a position of Investigator-Trainee. In 2006, he was admitted to the Postgraduate School of the Russian Ministry of Defense. In 2009 he graduated from the school and defended the thesis for PhD degree titled "Investigation of crimes committed by military personnel of the Armenian Military Forces during the armed conflicts". In December 2011, the Defense Minister appointed him to the Investigative Service of the Ministry of Defense. On 14 January 2015, he was appointed to the position of the Deputy Chairman of the Investigative Committee and Head of the General Military Investigative Department. In July 2018, by decree of government, he was appointed to a position of the Chairman of the RA Investigative Committee.

Hayk Grigoryan is the author of 48 scientific articles and works. He is fluent in the Armenian and Russian languages.

Honors

Ranks
 Lieutenant (2001)
 The Third Class Lawyer (2002)
 The Second Class Lawyer (2004)
 The First Class Lawyer  (2006)
 Senior Lieutenant (2006)
 Captain (2009)
 Major (2010)
 Lieutenant Colonel (2013)
 Lieutenant Colonel of Justice (2014)
 Colonel of Justice (2015)
 First Class Councilor of Justice (2018)
 Third Class State Councilor of Justice (2019)

Awards
Medal of the Prime Minister of Armenia (twice)
Medal "For strengthening of cooperation" (Artsakh)
Medal "For strengthening of cooperation"
Medal of Marshal Baghramyan
Medal "For Unimpeachable Service" (first and second degree)
Medal of "Vazgen Sargsyan"
Medal "20 Years Armenian Armed Forces"
Medal "NKR Defense Army, (Artsakh)
Medal "90 Years of Military University"
Medal "Dedication and Velour"
Medal "For Honorable Service" *Medal "Mother’s Gratitude" (Artsakh)
Medal "For Strengthening of RA Legal Order"
Jubilee Medal "100 Years of Security Services"
Jubilee Badge "100 Years of Prosecutor’s Office"
Medal "For Strengthening of International Cooperation"
Medal "75 years of Liberating of Republic of Belarus from German Fascist Conquerors"
Medal "For service and collaboration"
Medal "For Combat Cooperation"
Medal "Stronghold of Law"
Medal "For Earnings" (Russia)
Medal "For Earnings" (Belarus)

References

1976 births
Living people
Armenian politicians
Armenian lawyers
Armenian military personnel